Ronald Carter (born March 14, 1958) is a Canadian retired professional ice hockey right winger.

Early life
Carter was born in Montreal. He played junior ice hockey for the Sherbrooke Castors of the Quebec Major Junior Hockey League.

Career 
Carter was drafted by the Montreal Canadiens in the second round of the 1978 NHL Entry Draft. His rights were acquired by the expansion Edmonton Oilers, and he played two games for the Oilers in the 1979–80 season. Carter played only two games in the National Hockey League and went on to have a long career in minor professional leagues.

Career statistics

Regular season and playoffs

International

References

External links

1958 births
Living people
Canadian ice hockey right wingers
Dallas Black Hawks players
Edmonton Oilers players
Erie Blades players
Flint Generals (IHL) players
Houston Apollos players
Ice hockey people from Montreal
Mohawk Valley Comets players
Montreal Canadiens draft picks
Nashville South Stars (ACHL) players
Rochester Americans players
Sherbrooke Castors players
Springfield Indians players
Virginia Lancers (ACHL) players
Anglophone Quebec people